Reggie Hunt (born October 14, 1977) is a former professional gridiron football linebacker. He most recently played for the Edmonton Eskimos of the Canadian Football League. He was signed by the Scottish Claymores as a street free agent in 2001. He played college football for the TCU Horned Frogs.

Hunt has also played for the Saskatchewan Roughriders and Montreal Alouettes.

Early years
Hunt attended Denison High School in Denison, Texas and lettered in football and basketball.

Following high school graduation, Hunt attended Texas Christian University. As a senior, he won All-WAC honors at both safety and kick returner positions, and set the Horned Frogs single season kick return average record (34.1 yards). He finished his career with three interceptions, 271 tackles, and seven forced fumbles.

Professional career

Scottish Claymores
Hunt played a year of professional football with the NFL Europe Scottish Claymores in 2001. He finished the year with two interceptions, 30 tackles, and four forced fumbles.

Saskatchewan Roughriders
Hunt was signed as a free agent by Saskatchewan on May 17, 2002. His job was to replace departed linebacker George White (who had signed as a free agent with the Calgary Stampeders).  He quickly solidified himself as a force in the Canadian Football League and was named a CFL All-Star in 2003, as well as a two-time CFL Western Division All-Star in 2004 and 2006. Hunt won a Grey Cup championship with the Roughriders in 2007. He once  held  the CFL record for most tackles in a single game (16). Simoni Lawrence of the Hamilton Tiger Cats broke the previous record of 16 tackles in one single game in 2019 with a total of 17.

Montreal Alouettes
On February 19, 2008, it was reported that he had signed with the Montreal Alouettes. Hunt dressed and played in 14 games with the Alouettes as well as the East Final and the 96th Grey Cup loss. After the Alouettes decided to start non-import Shea Emry at middle linebacker, he was released on June 25, 2009.

Edmonton Eskimos
Hunt signed with the Edmonton Eskimos on September 25, 2009, reuniting him with former defensive coordinator Richie Hall, but was released the following offseason.

Personal life
Hunt is the older brother of Aaron Hunt, a former defensive lineman in the CFL, having spent the majority of his six years in the league with the BC Lions (2006 - 2011). Hunt officially announced his retirement on October 26, 2011 by signing a one-day contract with the Saskatchewan Roughriders so he could retire as a Roughrider. After retiring, he moved back home to Texas with and lives there with his 2 children.

References

External links
Saskatchewan Roughriders bio

1977 births
Living people
American football safeties
American players of Canadian football
Canadian football linebackers
Edmonton Elks players
Montreal Alouettes players
People from Denison, Texas
Players of American football from Texas
Saskatchewan Roughriders players
Scottish Claymores players
TCU Horned Frogs football players